Thomas Vincent O'Keefe (June 3, 1928 – October 18, 2015) was an American professional basketball player. O'Keefe was selected in the fourth round of the 1950 NBA draft by the Washington Capitols after a collegiate career at Georgetown University. O'Keefe only played one season in the league, splitting his time between the Capitols and the Baltimore Bullets.

O'Keefe returned to Georgetown as assistant coach of its basketball team from the 1956–57 season through the 1959–60 season, serving under head coach Tom Nolan. He then succeeded Nolan, and was Georgetown's head coach from the 1960–61 season through the 1965–66 season. A part-time head coach who remained active in business during his tenure, he compiled an overall record of 82–60 in six seasons before quitting the coaching profession in 1966 to focus entirely on business.

Head coaching record

References

1928 births
2015 deaths
American men's basketball players
Baltimore Bullets (1944–1954) players
Basketball coaches from New Jersey
Basketball players from Jersey City, New Jersey
Georgetown Hoyas men's basketball coaches
Georgetown Hoyas men's basketball players
Guards (basketball)
High school basketball coaches in the United States
Sportspeople from Jersey City, New Jersey
St. Peter's Preparatory School alumni
Washington Capitols draft picks
Washington Capitols players